The Rhiwlas Limestone is a geologic formation in Wales. It preserves fossils dating back to the Ordovician period.

See also

 List of fossiliferous stratigraphic units in England

References
 

Limestone formations